Fried may refer to:

Music
Fried (album), a 1984 album by Julian Cope
Fried (band), a band made up of U.S. soul singer Jonte Short and ex-The Beat and Fine Young Cannibals guitarist David Steele
"Fried", a song by E-40 from his 2011 album, Revenue Retrievin': Graveyard Shift

Other uses
Frying
Fried (surname)
Fried, Frank, Harris, Shriver & Jacobson, a law firm
Fried (2002 TV series), a British TV series
Fried (2015 TV series), a TV series aired on BBC Three
Fried's rule